Leucopogon grandiflorus  is a species of flowering plant in the heath family Ericaceae and is endemic to Carnarvon National Park in south-eastern Queensland. It is a shrub with softly-hairy branchlets, oblong leaves and white flowers.

Description

Taxonomy
Leucopogon grandiflorus was first formally described in 1990 by Leslie Pedley in the journal Austrobaileya from specimens collected by Clifford Gittins in 1961. The specific epithet (grandiflorus) means "large-flowered", alluding to the flowers being probably the largest in the genus.

Distribution and habitat
This leucopogon grows on shallow sandy soil over sandstone in and near Carnarvon National Park.

References

grandiflorus
Ericales of Australia
Flora of Queensland
Plants described in 1990